Allecula is a genus of beetles belonging to the family Tenebrionidae.

The genus was first described by Fabricius in 1801.

The genus has cosmopolitan distribution.

Species:
 Allecula morio (Fabricius, 1787)

References

Tenebrionidae